Royal Fam is an American hardcore hip hop group affiliated with Wu-Tang Clan. Timbo King is the leader and founding member of the group and Y-Kim The Ill Figure is their main producer. Other group members are Mighty Jarrett, Dark Denim, Dreddy Kruger and Sharecka (Stoneface).

Royal Fam is one of the first crew connected directly with Wu-Tang Clan, much like Killarmy and Sunz of Man. They are part of Wu-Tang Killa Beez and United Kingdom (Population Clik), a collective consisting of Royal Fam, Sunz of Man, Brooklyn Zu, C.O.I.N.S., Black Rose Kartel, The Beggaz Clan, Makeba Mooncycle and Popa Wu.

Their official debut studio album, "Black Castle", was recorded in 1995 and 1996 for Capitol Records and produced by Y-Kim The Ill Figure; it was scheduled to be released twice and shelved as many times. They also shot a video for Black Castle's debut single "Something Gots To Give". In 2020, Back2DaSource Records finally released the album, in its original format, completely how it was meant to be issued including unreleased and unknown material.

In 1997, Royal Fam featured with Prodigal Sunn on "La Saga" of IAM's album L'École du micro d'argent, winning a France Music Award for the song. Then they appeared with Killa Sin, Shyheim and Tekitha on Soul in the Hole (soundtrack). In 1998, they recorded the track "The Legacy" of Wu-Tang Killa Bees: The Swarm album and "Bobby Did It" of RZA's debut album Bobby Digital in Stereo. In 1999, Royal Fam featured on "Hip Hop Fury" and "Outro" of GZA's third album Beneath the Surface and in 2000 on "Walk The Dogs" produced by RZA of Ghost Dog: The Way of the Samurai (soundtrack).

Timbo King and Dreddy Kruger also appeared on the Jim Jarmusch's film Ghost Dog: The Way of the Samurai starring Forest Whitaker.

Royal Fam's second album, "Yesterday, Today, Iz Tomorrow", was recorded in 1999 for Wu-Tang Records and released in 2000 in Europe without the group's knowledge or permission, with unmixed songs and wrong tracklist. However, in 2021, the original version of the album was officially released thru De Rap Winkel Records. The album featured Prodigal Sunn and Hell Razah (Sunz Of Man), Armel (C.O.I.N.S.), Makeba Mooncycle and Kaos The Seventh Sign and was produced by Arabian Knight, John The Baptist, Linx 6, Y-Kim The Ill Figure and Tike.

In 2001, Royal Fam featured on "Revenge" of Cappadonna's second album The Yin and the Yang and in 2002 on "Spit That G" and "Woodchuck" of The Sting (Wu-Tang Clan album)

In 2002, Mighty Jarrett released the Reggae "Toppa Top/Mash It Up" single, which was executive produced by RZA.

In 2005, Y-Kim The Ill Figure released "Monster Reborn Vol. 1" for "Chambermusik", a compilation of rare and unreleased tracks he produced from the early to mid '90s. The same year Timbo King, Killah Priest, Hell Razah, Tragedy Khadafi & William Cooper released Black Market Militia album for Nature Sounds Records.

In 2011, Timbo King released his debut solo album From Babylon to Timbuk2, thru Nature Sounds Records and was largely produced by Bronze Nazareth.

In May 2013, Mighty Jarrett (Mikey Jarrett Jr.) died. He was also the road manager for International Reggae artist Junior Reid and has been an integral part of the One Blood Family for over fifteen years.

Discography
Black Castle (1996) - [Officially released in 2020]
Yesterday, Today, Iz Tomorrow (2000) - [Officially released in 2021]

Solo & Collaboration Albums 
Timbo King & Spark 950 - United We Slam EP (1993)
Y-Kim The Ill Figure - Monster Reborn Vol.1 (2005)
Black Market Militia - Black Market Militia (2005)
Maccabeez - The Spooks Who Kicked Down Tha Doorz (2005)
Timbo King - From Babylon to Timbuk2 (2011)
The Kraftsmen - Les Artisans EP (2013)
Timbo King & Tek (TNT) - Wu Camp (2017)
Timbo King, Xkwisit & Ab The Audicrat - T.I.M. (Thoughts In Motion) EP (2020) 
Timbo King & Shaka Amazulu The 7th - VerbaTIM (2023)

American hip hop groups
Wu-Tang Clan affiliates
Hardcore hip hop groups